Charles Cowper Jr. (29 September 1834 – 16 November 1911) was an Australian politician.

Cowper was born in Sydney, New South Wales, the son of Sir Charles Cowper, Premier of New South Wales on five different occasions between 1856 and 1870.

Cowper junior was member of the New South Wales Legislative Assembly for Tumut from 1 November 1860 to 24 October 1863, for Orange from 4 November 1863 to 10 November 1864 and Tumut again from 10 December 1864 to 25 July 1866.

Cowper was appointed clerk of the Executive Council of New South Wales, was a member of his father's Ministry, without a seat in the Cabinet, from September 1861 to October 1863. When his father's ministry fell in 1863, Cowper Jr resigned his seat of The Tumut to successfully challenge the new Premier James Martin at the Orange by-election, with Martin returning to parliament by winning the by-election for The Tumut, the seat vacated by Cowper Jr. Cowper Jr announced that he would not contest Orange at the December 1864 election, however he was nominated for The Tumut, defeating Martin for a second time.

Cowper became a police magistrate and then sheriff of New South Wales. Cowper died on 16 November 1911 at Beulah, Bowral, New South Wales, and was buried in the family vault at St Paul's Church, Cobbitty. Cowper was survived by four sons and a daughter, to whom he bequeathed most of his estate for devoting her life to mothering his grandchildren.

See also

References

 

1834 births
1911 deaths
Members of the New South Wales Legislative Assembly